Chuwar is a town and suburb of Ipswich in the City of Ipswich and a locality of the City of Brisbane in South East Queensland, Australia.

Geography 
The suburb is known for its leafy streets and solid brick homes which line Allawah Road, Lansdowne Way and Brodzig Road.

History 
The town takes its name from the parish, which in turn was named in October 1848 by surveyor James Warner. The origin of the name was not recorded by Warner but it  has been suggested that it was the Ugarapul  name for the district or a corruption of it.

On Friday 23 June 1876, the Kholo Bridge across the Brisbane River to Kholo was officially opened. Determined to have a first official crossing of the bridge, a group of men pulled a buggy containing a "courageous lady" across the submerged bridge and Mrs Foote smashed a bottle against a bridge post and named the bridge. A banquet followed the ceremony.

The median age of the Chuwar population was 34 years, 3 years below the Australian median of 37.  82.6% of people living in Chuwar were born in Australia. Other main countries of birth were England 4.9%, New Zealand 2.7%, South Africa 1.7%, Scotland 0.8%, and United States of America 0.4%.  95.3% of people spoke only English at home; the next most popular languages were, 0.5% Afrikaans, 0.3% Tagalog, 0.3% German, 0.3% Dutch, and 0.2% Portuguese.

Heritage listings 
Chuwar has a number of heritage-listed sites, including:

 Allawah Road: Mount Crosby Pumping Station

Amenities

Chuwar has a number of amenities including a service station, a produce store, two churches, a motorcycle track and a veterinary surgery. There is a shopping centre with a major supermarket in the neighbouring suburb of Karalee.  The suburb's two churches are Chuwar Baptist Church, which runs a yearly community day called the Street Party, and Rivers of Life Christian Church, which operates the Tivoli Drive In Theatre & Community Events Centre and market stalls. Chuwar includes the residential Karana Gardens Estate.

Chuwar includes Colleges Crossing, a popular park and river crossing on the Brisbane River with walking trails, lookouts, and clean water for swimming and fishing.

Transport
Chuwar is accessible by road with Mount Crosby Road directing traffic directly to Ipswich and Karana Downs, and the Warrego Highway routing traffic to Brisbane and Toowoomba.

Proposed Kenmore Bypass
The Kenmore Bypass, also known as the "Western Freeway Extension" and the "Moggill Pocket Sub-Arterial", is a proposed motorway to run from the Western Freeway at Fig Tree Pocket to the Warrego Highway at Chuwar, connecting the suburbs of Karalee, Anstead, Pullenvale and Kenmore, to divert traffic from the Ipswich Motorway and Moggill Road.

References

External links

 
 Town map of Chuwar, 1976
 Main Roads site describing Stage One of the arterial
 
 

Suburbs of the City of Brisbane
Localities in Queensland
Suburbs of Ipswich, Queensland